Catharosia is a genus of flies in the family Tachinidae. There are about 12 described species in Catharosia, found worldwide.

Species
These 12 species are members of the genus Catharosia.
Catharosia albisquama (Villeneuve, 1932)
Catharosia alutacea (Emden, 1945)
Catharosia calva (Coquillett, 1910)
Catharosia capensis Verbeke, 1970
Catharosia claripennis Kugler, 1977
Catharosia flavicornis (Zetterstedt, 1859)
Catharosia frontalis (Smith, 1917)
Catharosia lustrans (Reinhard, 1944)
Catharosia minuta (Townsend, 1915)
Catharosia nebulosa (Coquillett, 1897)
Catharosia pygmaea (Fallén, 1815)
Catharosia valescens Villeneuve, 1942

References

Phasiinae
Tachinidae genera
Taxa named by Camillo Rondani